The Keeper of Botany was a position at the Natural History Museum — formerly British Museum (Natural History) — in London, England, and served as head of department for botany.  The position was in place between 1827 and 2013.

Keepers of Botany 
The following is a list of those who have held this position.  Dates are those in office.

Robert Brown 1827–1858
John Joseph Bennett 1859–1870
William Carruthers 1871–1895
George Robert Milne Murray 1895–1905
Alfred Barton Rendle 1906–1930
John Ramsbottom 1930–1950
George Taylor 1950–1956
James Edgar Dandy 1956–1966
Robert Ross 1966–1977
John Francis Michael Cannon 1977–1990
Stephen Blackmore 1990–1999
Richard Bateman 2000–2004
Johannes C. Vogel 2004–2012
Philip Stephen Rainbow (Acting) 2012–2013

References

Natural History Museum, London
Keeper of Botany, Natural History Museum
Keeper of Botany, Natural History Museum
Lists of English people